The Steane code is a tool in quantum error correction introduced by Andrew Steane in 1996. It is a CSS code (Calderbank-Shor-Steane), using the classical binary  [7,4,3] Hamming code to correct for qubit flip errors (X errors) and the dual of the Hamming code, the [7,3,4] code, to correct for phase flip errors (Z errors). The Steane code encodes one logical qubit in 7 physical qubits and is able to correct arbitrary single qubit errors.

Its check matrix in standard form is 
 

where H is the parity-check matrix of the Hamming code and is given by

 

The  Steane code is the first in the family of quantum Hamming codes, codes with parameters  for integers .  It is also a quantum color code.

Expression in the stabilizer formalism 

In a quantum error correcting code, the codespace is the subspace of the overall Hilbert space where all logical states live. In an -qubit stabilizer code, we can describe this subspace by its Pauli stabilizing group, the set of all -qubit Pauli operators which stabilize every logical state. The stabilizer formalism allows us to define the codespace of a stabilizer code by specifying its Pauli stabilizing group. We can efficiently describe this exponentially large group by listing its generators.

Since the Steane code encodes one logical qubit in 7 physical qubits, the codespace for the Steane code is a -dimensional subspace of its -dimensional Hilbert space.

In the stabilizer formalism, the Steane code has 6 generators:

Note that each of the above generators is the tensor product of 7 single-qubit Pauli operations. The tensor products are often omitted in notation for brevity.

The logical  and  gates are 

The logical  and  states of the Steane code are

Arbitrary codestates are of the form .

References

Quantum information science